The Icelandic Women's Basketball League Cup (Icelandic: Deildarbikar kvenna) is basketball competition between clubs in Iceland run by the Icelandic Basketball Association.

History and format
The League Cup was founded in 2020 by the Icelandic Basketball Association. The Cup is split in upper and lower part. In the upper part features the 8 teams from the top-tier Úrvalsdeild kvenna while the lower part features 8 teams from the second-tier 1. deild kvenna. All the rounds are played with a single game knockout format.

The first games are scheduled to start on 30 August 2020 with the final being played on 12 September 2020.

See also
Icelandic Basketball Federation
Úrvalsdeild karla
Icelandic Basketball Cup
Icelandic Basketball Supercup
Icelandic Division I

References

External links
 Icelandic Basketball Federation 

2020 establishments in Iceland
Women's basketball league cups competitions in Europe
Basketball cup competitions in Europe
Recurring sporting events established in 2020